Denton North East is an electoral ward of Tameside, England. It is represented in Westminster by Andrew Gwynne Labour MP for Denton and Reddish.

Councillors 
The ward is represented by three councillors: Vincent Ricci (Lab), Allison Gwynne (Lab), and Denise Ward (Lab).

 indicates seat up for re-election.
 indicates seat won in by-election.

Elections in 2010s

May 2019

May 2018

May 2016

May 2015

May 2014

May 2012

May 2011

May 2010

Elections in 2000s

By-election 30 July 2009

May 2008

May 2007

May 2006

June 2004

References 

Wards of Tameside
Denton, Greater Manchester